South Port is a port located on the western coast of Xiuying District, Haikou, Hainan, China. It operates as the south terminal of the Yuehai Ferry service, part of the Guangdong–Hainan Railway. This ferry transports train cars across the Qiongzhou Strait between the Leizhou Peninsula at the southern tip of Guangdong on mainland China, and the northern coast of Hainan. Ferry boats arrive at South Port, unload the train cars onto tracks. The train cars then proceed a few hundred metres southeast to the Haikou Railway Station which is the last stop on the Guangdong–Hainan Railway.

Gallery

See also
Haikou Port New Seaport, a new seaport located around 1 km north of South Port, opened in 2017

Notes

External links

Ports and harbours of Hainan
Rail transport in Hainan